Soveja is a commune located in Vrancea County, Romania. It is composed of two villages, Dragosloveni and Rucăreni; the former is the commune centre.

Notable people
Simion Mehedinți (1868-1962), geographer

References

Communes in Vrancea County
Localities in Western Moldavia
Spa towns in Romania